Ban Rong is a village and tambon (subdistrict) of Ngao District, in Lampang Province, Thailand. In 2005 it had a total population of 6616 people. The tambon contains 11  villages.

References

Tambon of Lampang province
Populated places in Lampang province